Many traditional places were renamed in Pakistan before and after the independence of the country in 1947.

Here is a list of renamed places in Pakistan.

Renamed cities

Renamed districts, towns, and neighborhoods

Renamed monuments, parks, and roads

See also
Renaming of cities in India

References

English exonyms
Pakistan
Renamed
Policies of Pakistan